Delhi City Lok Sabha constituency was a Lok Sabha (parliamentary) constituency in Delhi from 1951-56. This constituency comprised the entire Kashmere Gate, Kotwali and Hauz Qazi police stations and part of Faiz Bazar police station (excluding the area covered by the erstwhile New Delhi Municipality) of Delhi, which was a Part C state from 1950-56.

Members of Parliament

See also
 Chandni Chowk (Lok Sabha constituency)
 Delhi Sadar (Lok Sabha constituency)

References

Former constituencies of the Lok Sabha
1951 establishments in India
1956 disestablishments in India
Constituencies established in 1951
Constituencies disestablished in 1956
Former Lok Sabha constituencies of Delhi